Nassau County Courthouse, Old Nassau County Courthouse, or other variants thereof may refer to the following:

 Nassau County Courthouse (Florida)
 Old Nassau County Courthouse (New York)